The 1928 Birmingham–Southern Panthers football team was an American football team that represented Birmingham–Southern College as a member of the Southern Intercollegiate Athletic Association during the 1928 college football season. In their first season under head coach Jenks Gillem, the team compiled a 3–2–4 record.

Schedule

References

Birmingham–Southern
Birmingham–Southern Panthers football seasons
Birmingham–Southern Panthers football